Donald Raymond Fisher (February 6, 1916 – July 29, 1973) was a Major League Baseball pitcher who appeared in two games for the New York Giants in 1945.  The 29-year-old rookie was a native of Cleveland, Ohio.

Fisher is one of many ballplayers who only appeared in the major leagues during World War II.  He made his major league debut in relief on August 25, 1945, against the Brooklyn Dodgers at Ebbets Field. He pitched the last five innings of one of the games of the doubleheader and gave up four earned runs.

Fisher played his next and last game on September 30, 1945, the last day of the season, he started the first game of a doubleheader against the Boston Braves at Braves Field.  He pitched a 13-inning complete game shutout, winning 1–0.

In 18 total innings pitched Fisher allowed just 19 baserunners and 4 earned runs, giving him an ERA of 2.00 to go along with his 1–0 record.

Fisher died at the age of 57 in Mayfield Heights, Ohio.

External links

Retrosheet

1916 births
1973 deaths
Major League Baseball pitchers
New York Giants (NL) players
Baseball players from Cleveland